Great Sea may refer to:

 Belegaer, a fictional sea in Lord of the Rings
 Great Sea, a fictional setting in The Legend of Zelda video game series
 Mediterranean Sea, called the Great Sea in the Bible